Chips Ahoy is a Walt Disney-produced animated CinemaScope theatrical short. It was released to theaters on February 24, 1956, and was the second to last Disney cartoon to be distributed by RKO Radio Pictures. It is also the second to last regular Disney theatrical cartoon to feature Donald Duck in a starring role and the final appearance of Chip 'n' Dale in The Golden Age of Animation and their final appearance overall, until the 1959 Walt Disney Presents television special "The Adventures of Chip 'n' Dale". It was reissued in 1985 to accompany The Black Cauldron.

Plot
Chip and Dale are both hungry sitting in their tree, surrounded by a huge lake, which has few acorns. After a squabble over their last one, which falls into the lake below, Chip sees a larger tree overflowing with some across the way from them. However, the lake stands between them and their potential gain.

They spot a ship in a bottle in Donald Duck's fishing shack and decide to use it to attempt to cross the lake. Later, as Donald is taking a stroll along the pier, he spots them carrying the ship and salutes them. He doesn't realize that they have pilfered his ship until he returns to the shack, and sets out to get it back from them.

Donald catches the ship with a fishing pole and reels it in. To get back at Chip and Dale, who have put on miniature costumes and taken on the personas of the ship's captain and a seaman respectively, he torments them with the ship's rudder, filling the cabin with water (forcing them to pump it out), then puts on an imaginary series of stormy weather. The ruse seems to work, as Dale gets seasick. However, when he leans over the gunwale to vomit, he spots Donald's feet on the ground and alerts Chip of the trick, making them be able to escape into quarters before Donald can get them while slamming his finger in the door. Undeterred, he tricks Dale into getting captured. Chip counters by releasing the ship's anchor right on Donald's foot so that he drops both Dale and the ship.

Dale then ties Donald up and jumps back onto the ship, moments before Donald can free himself. As Chip sees this, he panics and tries to steer the ship away, while Donald begins chasing them. However, Dale is a step ahead of Chip and Donald and has cut a hole in Donald's boat sail, drilled holes in his canoe, unscrewed the bolts to dismantle his rowboat, and tied his motorboat to the dock. When his motorboat is pulled by the rope, Donald flies out of it and takes a header into the tree just as Chip and Dale reach it, filling acorns in their loot. A furious Donald tries one more time to catch them, but falls and causes a wave to carry the ship back to the tree, where they eat their haul of acorns. Undaunted, however, Donald, now stranded on the island, chops down the tree and tries to build a dugout canoe.

Voice cast
 Donald Duck: Clarence Nash
 Chip: Jimmy MacDonald
 Dale: Dessie Flynn

Home media
The short was released on November 11, 2008 on Walt Disney Treasures: The Chronological Donald, Volume Four: 1951-1961.

Additional releases include:
VHS - A Tale of Two Chipmunks

References

External links

1956 films
1956 animated films
Donald Duck short films
1950s Disney animated short films
CinemaScope films
Films directed by Jack Kinney
Films produced by Walt Disney
Films scored by Oliver Wallace
1950s English-language films
1950s American films
Chip 'n' Dale films